Richard Mylan (born 24 November 1972) is a Welsh actor and former dancer. He is best known for his roles in The Bill, Bad Girls and Grownups as Chris.

Early life
Mylan was born in Swansea in 1973. There he attended the Birchgrove Junior School, where he played rugby, and in 1982 won the Swansea heat of the British 'Disco Kids Championships'. At the age of 12 he left Swansea to study dance in London at the Urdang Academy.

Career
Mylan's first professional job was in the roller-skating musical Starlight Express (1984) at the Apollo Victoria Theatre in London, where he played for about four years, firstly as 'Flat-Top' (he can be heard in the original-cast recording) and afterwards in the bigger role of Electra the Electric Train.  He was also in the funk band, Puppy Phat, who played at Ronnie Scott's Jazz Club and elsewhere.

Mylan is best known as “Oliver Morris” in the television sitcom, Coupling (2004), Chris in Grownups (in 2007 and 2009) and Joe Andrews in BBC Wales drama Belonging (in 2006). Other television work has included the role of Danny Flint in Where the Heart Is (in 2005 and 2006), Harry in Wild West (2002-2004), Border Cafe, Ben Phillips in Bad Girls (2004-2005), Leroy Jones in The Bill (1998-2001) and Doctors (as Dr Simon Hills in 2004 and as Will Duncan in 2010). He appeared in the 2009 film City Rats. He also made a guest appearance in TV sitcom My Family in 2007. He played Simon Lowsley, the deputy headteacher, in Waterloo Road until 2014. In 2014, he was cast in The Frantic Assembly performance "The Believers".

Personal life
Mylan is married to makeup artist Tammie Dineen.

His son Jaco, who was born in 2005 (with former partner actress Catrin Powell), has a form of autism known as Pervasive Developmental Disorder (PDD). He presented a documentary on the subject of his son and autism which was broadcast on the BBC in April 2017 entitled Richard and Jaco: Life with Autism.

Mylan supports Welsh independence.

Mylan has battled heroin addiction for 20 years as revealed in BBC2 Documentary 'Footlights'.

Filmography

Television

References

External links
Richard Mylan - official website

1973 births
Living people
Male actors from Swansea
Welsh male television actors
20th-century Welsh male actors
21st-century Welsh male actors